In comics, an ongoing series is a series that runs indefinitely. This is in contrast to limited series (a series intended to end after a certain number of issues thus limited), a one shot (a comic book which is not a part of an ongoing series), a graphic novel, or a trade paperback. However, a series of graphic novels may be considered ongoing as well. The term may also informally refer to a current or incomplete limited series with a predetermined number of issues.

Characteristics 
An ongoing series is traditionally published on a fixed schedule, typically monthly or bimonthly but many factors can cause an issue to be published late. In the past, the schedule was often maintained with the use of fill-in issues (usually by a different creative team, sometimes hurting quality), but increasingly the practice has been to simply delay publication.

An ongoing "might run for decades and hundreds of issues or be canceled after only a handful of issues". When an ongoing series ceases to be published because the story has ended, it may be called "finished". If it ceases to be published because of low sales, editorial decisions, publisher bankruptcy, or other reasons, it is "cancelled". An ending might be written for the last issues of a cancelled series, or the series may simply disappear without warning and never return.

If a series ceases to be published, but may be published again, it is called "on hiatus". Many series are placed "on hiatus" but do not return even after several years.

For series that are creator owned, the copyright holder has the option of approaching other publishers to see if they would be open to resuming the title under their imprint. For instance, Usagi Yojimbo has had four consecutive publishers.

Examples

Examples of ongoing series
 Action Comics; "a series that has been published nearly continuously since 1938".
 Detective Comics; the first volume was published from 1937 to 2011 and then later continued in 2016. The series published 881 issues between 1937 and 2011 and is the longest continuously published comic book in the United States.

Examples of limited series
 52

Examples of finished series
 Y: The Last Man
 Cerebus the Aardvark 
 The Sandman
 Preacher 
 God Is Dead
The Walking Dead
Lumberjanes; originally planned as an eight-part limited series, the comic was made an ongoing series following strong sales and critical acclaim. The comic series came to a close after 75 issues with a one-shot finale in December 2020, ending its six-year-run.
Mickey Mouse; a Disney comic book series that first appeared in 1943 as part of the Four Color one-shot series. It received its own numbering system with issue #28 (December 1952), and after many iterations with various publishers, ended with #330 (June 2017) from IDW Publishing.

Examples of cancelled series
 Slingers
 Justice League International
  Dungeons & Dragons: Fell's Five

Examples of relaunched series
 Superman (at least one relaunch in 1987 and 2011)
 The Amazing Spider-Man (relaunched in 1999 and re-numbered to original numbering beginning with #59 (500))
 Fantastic Four (relaunched in 1996 and again in 1997 as well as 2012)
 Avengers (relaunched in 1996, 1997, 2010 and 2012)
 Fallen Angel (cancelled by DC Comics, subsequently relaunched by IDW Publishing)

References	

Comics terminology